The 1934 Morningside Maroons football team was an American football that represented Morningside College as a member of the during the Iowa Conference and North Central Conference (NCC) during the 1934 college football season. Led by 23rd-year head coach Jason M. Saunderson, the Maroons compiled an overall record of 4–3–1 with a mark of 1–2 in Iowa Conference play, placing ninth, and 2–1–1 against NCC opponents, tying for second place.

Schedule

References

Morningside
Morningside Mustangs football seasons
Morningside Maroons football